Oakbank may refer to:

Places
Oakbank, Manitoba, Canada
Oakbank, Mull, a place on the Isle of Mull, Argyll and Bute, Scotland
Oakbank, Perth, Perth and Kinross, Scotland
Oakbank, West Lothian, a location in Scotland
Oakbank, South Australia, Australia

Other uses
Oakbank Easter Racing Carnival, held in Oakbank, South Australia

See also
Oakbank School (disambiguation)